"Where Did It All Go Wrong?" is a song and single by the English rock band Oasis, originally released on their 2000 album, Standing on the Shoulder of Giants.

Written by guitarist Noel Gallagher, it is one of two songs on Standing on the Shoulder of Giants that features him on lead vocals. In explaining why front man Liam Gallagher did not sing the song, Noel claimed that: "[Vocally] Liam just couldn't get that one. The melody shifts quite a lot... Liam hasn't got that dynamism in his voice."

Noel stated that the song's lyrics are about a circle of friends that he was involved with at one time in his life, as well as being semi-autobiographical. Q Magazine stated that the song is "Easily a stand-out moment in the vast pantheon of Gallagher anthems... [an] evocative heartbreak record for the disaffected middle youth who is still a vulnerable youngster at the core..."

An early demo of the track featured flutist Charlotte Glasson, but when the album was re-recorded the flute part was not included. Glasson featured on Gas Panic! from the same album.

Although not released as a commercial single, the song was released as a radio-single in the United States, where the song received airplay but failed to chart widely due in part to no official release. However, it did peak at No. 49 on the Radio and Records Alternative chart.

Music video
The video features Liam being interviewed whilst Noel sings whilst reading a newspaper and looking at what is going on in the building opposite where he and the band are.

Personnel
Oasis
 Noel Gallagher – lead vocals, lead guitars, rhythm guitar, acoustic guitar, bass, keyboards
 Alan White – drums, percussion

Additional 
 Paul Stacey – additional acoustic guitar

Charts

References

1999 songs
Oasis (band) songs
Songs written by Noel Gallagher
Song recordings produced by Noel Gallagher
2000 singles
Epic Records singles
Song recordings produced by Spike Stent